Blașcovici (deprecated: Colonia Blascovici;) is a district of Timișoara. At the beginning of the 20th century, Blașcovici was a colony of Mehala. Before that, a wealthy family of Roman Catholic canons, the Blaskovits, lived here. It is said that they had a house somewhere near the former headquarters of the Traffic Police, from where, so far as Ronaț, the garden of their domain stretched. The parcelling of the area began around 1900; the first streets in the district appeared on the place of the former garden.

References 

Districts of Timișoara